Anzio is a city in Italy

Anzio may also refer to:

 Anzio (film), a 1968 war film
 Anzio (game), a 1968 board wargame by Avalon Hill
 Anzio Beachhead, a 1969 board wargame by SPI
 Anzio 20mm rifle, an American anti-materiel rifle
 Battle of Anzio, part of the Italian Campaign of World War II
 , two ships of the United States Navy